Akhba is a surname. Notable people with the surname include:

Dmitry Akhba (born 1985), Russian footballer
Igor Akhba (born 1949), Abkhazian politician